Sir Timothy Lewis Achilles Daunt  (born 11 October 1935) is a retired diplomat and former Lieutenant Governor of the Isle of Man.

Early life
Educated at Sherborne School and St Catharine's College, Cambridge,

Career
Daunt was commissioned into the Royal Armoured Corps in 1955 and posted to the 8th King's Royal Irish Hussars. After completing national service, he joined the diplomatic service and, after a series of postings, became Permanent Representative to NATO in Brussels in 1982 and then British Ambassador to Turkey from 1986 to his retirement in 1992.

In retirement he became Lieutenant Governor of the Isle of Man. He later became chairman of the Ottoman Fund, a business established to provide mortgages for properties in Turkey.

Family
In 1962 he married Patricia Susan Knight.

References

 

1935 births
Living people
Knights Commander of the Order of St Michael and St George
British diplomats
Lieutenant Governors of the Isle of Man
Members of HM Diplomatic Service
People educated at Sherborne School
Alumni of St Catharine's College, Cambridge
8th King's Royal Irish Hussars officers
Timothy
20th-century British Army personnel
Royal Armoured Corps officers
20th-century British diplomats